Charles W. Sawyer (February 10, 1887April 7, 1979) was an American lawyer and diplomat who served as the United States Secretary of Commerce from May 6, 1948 to January 20, 1953 in the administration of Harry Truman.

Early life
Sawyer was born in Cincinnati, Ohio on February 10, 1887. He was a son of Caroline (née Butler) Sawyer and Edward Milton Sawyer, a Maine Republican who moved to Ohio become a principal.

He attended Oberlin College, earning a Bachelor of Arts degree in 1908, followed by the University of Cincinnati, where he received his law degree in 1911.

Career

He served as a member of Cincinnati City Council from 1912 until 1916 when he ran for Mayor of Cincinnati losing to George Puchta. Prior to his political career, he worked at the Cincinnati law firm of Dinsmore & Shohl. During World War I, he served as an infantryman in France, where he attained the rank of Major. Sawyer was also involved in several business ventures, including the American Rolling Mill Company and a share of the Cincinnati Reds, the Cincinnati Gardens, and a chain of newspapers and radio stations (through Great Trails Broadcasting Corporation).

Between the Wars, he was a prominent Ohio Democratic politician. In the 1930s, a faction led by Sawyer vied with a faction led by Martin L. Davey for control of the state Democratic party. He was the 44th lieutenant governor of Ohio from 1933 to 1935. Sawyer authored the Twenty-first Amendment which repealed the Eighteenth Amendment to the U.S. Constitution which established the prohibition of alcohol in the United States. In 1938, Sawyer was an unsuccessful candidate for governor of Ohio.

Federal service

In 1944, President Franklin D. Roosevelt appointed Sawyer as the United States Ambassador to Belgium and served as was Minister to Luxembourg during the difficult period from 1944 to 1946, at the beginning of the Belgian Royal Question concerning King Leopold III of Belgium. Two years later, President Harry Truman appointed Sawyer to the U.S. Civil Service Commission's Review Board. Sawyer had first met Truman upon the latter's arrival in Antwerp en route to Germany to attend the Potsdam Conference.

In 1948, Sawyer was chosen to succeed W. Averell Harriman as the United States Secretary of Commerce. While Secretary of Commerce, Sawyer was ordered by Truman to seize and operate the steel mills in 1952. This seizure was executed to prevent a labor strike which Truman believed would hamper the ability of the United States to proceed in the war in Korea.

While Secretary of Commerce, Secretary Sawyer declared the first National Secretaries Week from June 1 to 7, 1952. He designated Wednesday, June 4, as National Secretaries Day for this formerly male-dominated field of work turned female-dominated by sociocultural anamorphisms. Upon the end of Truman's term as office, Sawyer's term as Commerce Secretary also ended and he was succeeded by the Republican Sinclair Weeks who served during the administration of President Dwight D. Eisenhower.

Later career
When Sawyer returned to Cincinnati after serving President Truman, he joined the law firm of Taft, Stettinius, and Hollister, which had been founded by another prominent Cincinnati politician, Robert A. Taft (the elder son of President William Howard Taft), and became its managing partner. Following Taft's death, Sawyer succeeded to his seat on the board of the Central Trust Company, a Cincinnati bank.

In 1968, he authored Concerns of a Conservative Democrat which was published by the Southern Illinois University Press. Sawyer served on the Hoover Commission on Overseas Task Force, the Commission on Money and Credit, and the World's Fair Site Committee.

Sawyer gave $1 million to purchase 123 acres of riverfront property in Cincinnati for what became Sawyer Point Park.

Personal life

On July 15, 1918 Sawyer married his first wife, Margaret Sterrett Johnston, a niece of Col. William Cooper Procter of Procter & Gamble. Together, they had five children, two daughters and three sons, including:  Anne Johnston Sawyer (who married John Pattison Williams. She later married John Bradley Greene); Charles W. Sawyer II; Jean Johnston Sawyer (who married the Very Rev. John J. Weaver, Dean of Detroit Cathedral, in 1948); John William Sawyer; and Edward Milton Sawyer.

After Margaret's death in 1937, Sawyer married his second wife, Countess Elizabeth (née Lippelman) de Veyrac (1907-1999), on June 10, 1942. Elizabeth, who was living in Glendale, Ohio, was previously married to Louis Renner of Cincinnati and then Count Robert de Veyrac. They had no children.

He died in April 1979, at age 92, at his home in Palm Beach, Florida. He was buried at Spring Grove Cemetery near his birthplace in Cincinnati, Ohio.

References

External links

Charles W. Sawyer at Ohio History Central
Secretary of Commerce Charles W. Sawyer Looks at the 1950 Census Results at the Harry S. Truman Presidential Library and Museum

1887 births
1979 deaths
United States Secretaries of Commerce
Truman administration cabinet members
20th-century American politicians
Politicians from Cincinnati
Cincinnati City Council members
Lieutenant Governors of Ohio
Ohio Democrats
Ohio lawyers
Ambassadors of the United States to Belgium
Ambassadors of the United States to Luxembourg
University of Cincinnati College of Law alumni
Burials at Spring Grove Cemetery
20th-century American diplomats